The Tour de Sauvabelin (literally "Tower of Sauvabelin") is a wooden tower located in the Sauvabelin forest, Lausanne, Switzerland.

The tower was built in 2003 and is 35 meters high by Julius Natterer.  It provides with panoramic view on the city of Lausanne, the Lake Léman and the surrounding countryside and mountains.

See also 
 Lac de Sauvabelin
 Spiral stairs

Notes and references

External links 

 Official website
 Page on the website of the City of Lausanne

Lausanne
Tourist attractions in Lausanne